Mainstream Kenyah, also known as Usun Apau and Bakung, is a Kayan dialect cluster of North Kalimantan, Indonesia, and Sarawak, Malaysia.  Dialects fall into four clusters:

Lepo’ Tau, Lepo’ Bem, Uma’ Jalan, Uma’ Tukung
Lepo’ Ke, Lepo’ Kuda
Lepo’ Maut, Lepo’ Ndang, Badeng (Madang)
Bakung, Lepo’ Tepu’ (Lepo Teppu’).

Phonology

Consonants 

 Sounds  can also occur as geminated  or as unreleased in word-final .

Vowels 

  can also occur as lax .
 Sounds  can also be heard as long .

References

External links 
 Kaipuleohone's archive of Robert Blust's work includes notes on Kenyah language

Languages of Indonesia
Kenyah languages
Languages of Malaysia